Still Loving You is a compilation album by the German hard rock band Scorpions.

Background
Subtitled More Gold Ballads, the record is a follow-up to the 1985 compilation Gold Ballads.  Nine of the tracks were remixed for this album by Erwin Musper at Wisseloord Studios, Hilversum, the Netherlands. The song "Living for Tomorrow" appears here for the first time.

Track listing
 "Believe in Love - Remix" (Rudolf Schenker, Klaus Meine) – 4:54 
 "Still Loving You - Remix" (Schenker, Meine) – 6:12 
 "Walking on the Edge - Remix" (Schenker, Meine) – 4:50 
 "Born to Touch Your Feelings - Remix" (Schenker, Meine) – 7:21 
 "Lady Starlight - Remix" (Schenker, Meine) – 6:26 
 "Wind of Change" (Meine) – 5:10 
 "Is There Anybody There? - Remix" (Schenker, Meine, Herman Rarebell) – 4:23 
 "Always Somewhere - Remix" (Schenker, Meine) – 4:57 
 "Holiday - Remix" (Schenker, Meine) – 6:26 
 "When the Smoke Is Going Down - Remix" (Schenker, Meine) – 3:51 
 "Living for Tomorrow" (live) (Schenker, Meine) – 7:14

Personnel
Klaus Meine - vocals
Rudolf Schenker - rhythm guitar, lead guitar on tracks 2, 5, 6, 8, 10
Matthias Jabs - lead guitar, rhythm guitar on tracks 2, 5, 6, 8, 10
Uli Jon Roth - lead guitar on "Born to Touch Your Feelings"
Michael Schenker - lead guitar on "Holiday"
Francis Buchholz - bass
Herman Rarebell - drums

Singles

Still Loving You

Released in Europe as a CD single.

 "Still Loving You - Remix" – 6:12
 "Still Loving You - Remix Radio Version" – 3:58
 "Media Overkill" – 3:34

Living for Tomorrow

"Living for Tomorrow" was released in Europe as a 7" vinyl and CD single. The single contained an edited version of the song that eliminated the spoken introduction and faded the ending. This version was used in television advertising for Mustang Jeans, a German clothing company, and their logo appeared on the single's sleeve.

 "Living for Tomorrow" – 3:35
 "Bad Boys Running Wild" – 3:53

Charts

Certifications

References

Scorpions (band) compilation albums
1992 compilation albums
Harvest Records compilation albums